Marcos Sebastián Pol Gutiérrez (born 15 March 1988) is an Argentine-born Chilean footballer who plays for Rangers de Talca as a striker.

Career
Born in Tunuyán, Pol began playing football in San Lorenzo's youth ranks, and made his professional debut with Costa Rican Primera side Cartaginés in 2006. In August 2007, after an impressive season in Costa Rica, he joined Dacia Mioveni, in where he had a poor spell, and then he arrived to Bolivia, playing at Guabirá and Real Potosí. In 2012, Pol signed for Chilean powerhouse Cobreloa. Next, he moved to Primera División club Santiago Wanderers.

Personal life
In 2019, he naturalized Chilean by residence.

References

External links
 
 

1988 births
Living people
Sportspeople from Mendoza Province
Argentine footballers
Argentine expatriate footballers
Naturalized citizens of Chile
Chilean footballers
C.S. Cartaginés players
CS Mioveni players
Guabirá players
Club Real Potosí players
Cobreloa footballers
Santiago Wanderers footballers
Audax Italiano footballers
San Marcos de Arica footballers
Coquimbo Unido footballers
Deportes La Serena footballers
Deportes Valdivia footballers
O'Higgins F.C. footballers
Everton de Viña del Mar footballers
Cobresal footballers
Rangers de Talca footballers
Liga FPD players
Liga I players
Bolivian Primera División players
Chilean Primera División players
Primera B de Chile players
Torneo Federal A players
Argentine expatriate sportspeople in Costa Rica
Argentine expatriate sportspeople in Romania
Argentine expatriate sportspeople in Bolivia
Argentine expatriate sportspeople in Chile
Expatriate footballers in Costa Rica
Expatriate footballers in Romania
Expatriate footballers in Bolivia
Expatriate footballers in Chile
Association football forwards